The 2014 South Sydney Rabbitohs season was the 105th in the club's history. Coached by Michael Maguire and captained by John Sutton, they competed in the National Rugby League's 2014 Telstra Premiership.

Season summary

Milestones
On Sunday 5 October 2014, the South Sydney Rabbitohs finally ended their 43-year drought, and claimed the NRL Premiership Trophy after defeating the Canterbury-Bankstown Bulldogs in the Grand Final, 30–6.

Squad List

Squad Movement

Gains

Losses

Re-signings

Contract lengths

Ladder

Fixtures

Pre-season

In 2014, the Rabbitohs again competed in three pre-season trial matches.

NRL Auckland Nines

The NRL Auckland Nines is a pre-season rugby league nines competition featuring all 16 NRL clubs. The 2014 competition was played over two days on 15 and 16 February at Eden Park in Auckland, New Zealand. The Rabbitohs featured in Pool Red and played the Panthers, Storm and Dragons. The top two teams of each pool qualified for the quarter finals.

Pool Play

Finals

Grand final

Player statistics

Representative honours

Post-season

References

South Sydney Rabbitohs seasons
South Sydney Rabbitohs season